Godfrey Miyanda (born 1944) is a Zambian politician and former military figure. In 1993, he served as the fifth vice-president of Zambia under Frederick Chiluba's administration. Miyanda professes to be a  born-again Christian. He is married to Angela Miyanda. They have four children.

Early life
Miyanda begun his early schooling in Kitwe at Kitwe Main School. He later attended Buseko and Kawama Primary schools in Kitwe. He later attended Katete and Munali secondary schools up to form five. He also attended a one year part-time course in Business Management at Evelyn Hone College of Higher Education.

Career
Miyanda was  a career soldier. He attended an officers course at Mons Officer Cadet School in Aldershot, England. He did further training at Hythe in Kent and another course at Warminster in England. He attended a Staff Officers course in Canada in 1968.

Miyanda has attended several leadership courses and programmes. He has held several positions in the Army, including Platoon Commander, Emplaning, Intelligence Officer, Adjutant, Battalion Second-In-Command, Battalion Commander, General Staff Officer Grade One, and Colonel General Staff at Army Headquarters. His last position in the Army was Chief of Logistics. Miyanda established the Zambia Military Academy, being its first head at Kohima Barracks based in Kabwe, central province of Zambia. His contemporaries in military training include General Kingsley Chinkuli, Zambia's first black army chief, General Benjamin Mibenge, late Colonel Patrick Kafumukache, late General Christon Tembo, former Zambian vice president.

He is a trained Caterpillar salesman, having attended intensive earth-moving science and sales courses in Nairobi, Kenya and Malaga, Spain. He learnt to operate most Caterpillar earth moving equipment. He is also a qualified Public Service Vehicle Driver. In 1980, Miyanda was dismissed from the army by Kenneth Kaunda for involvement an alleged coup plot. He was blacklisted for many years and drove a taxi cab. He was subsequently cleared of all the charges.

Political career
He joined the growing opposition to Kenneth Kaunda and was later one of the senior members of the Movement for Multi-Party Democracy (MMD). He subsequently served under President Frederick Chiluba as Minister without Portfolio and National Secretary of the MMD until 1995. In 1993, after the resignation of Levy Mwanawasa, Miyanda was appointed as Vice President. At the 1995 MMD party convention he was elected the party's vice president. In 1997, he was demoted to the post of Minister of Education, although he remained the vice president of the MMD.

Miyanda was expelled from the MMD, together with the famous 22 senior party officials, in 2001 for opposing President Chiluba's third presidential term bid. The third term bid was actively supported and led by Michael Sata, the National Secretary of the MMD.

Heritage Party
Since 2001 Miyanda is serving as president of the Heritage Party in Zambia. It was formed after his expulsion from the Movement for Multi-Party Democracy (MMD) in May 2001 for opposing the third term bid for president. In 2001 general elections, the party won four parliamentary seats in a unicameral Zambian parliament. The party also won a few local councilors positions across the country. However, the four members of parliament were poached by the then late Zambian president Levy Mwanawasa by including them in government ministerial positions to strengthen parliament numbers. In subsequent elections in 2006, the four members joined then ruling MMD party and heritage party lost all seats in parliament.

Miyanda can be described as a perennial candidate. He has unsuccessfully run for president four times (2001, 2006, 2008 and 2011).

References

1944 births
Graduates of the Mons Officer Cadet School
Living people
People from Copperbelt Province
Vice-presidents of Zambia
Zambian military personnel
Movement for Multi-Party Democracy politicians
Heritage Party (Zambia) politicians
Zambian Protestants
Members of the National Assembly of Zambia
Alumni of Munali Secondary School